Type-1 angiotensin II receptor-associated protein is a protein that in humans is encoded by the AGTRAP gene.

This gene encodes a transmembrane protein localized to the plasma membrane and perinuclear vesicular structures. The gene product interacts with the angiotensin II type I receptor and negatively regulates angiotensin II signaling. Alternative splicing of this gene generates multiple transcript variants encoding different isoforms.

Interactions
AGTRAP has been shown to interact with GNB2L1.

References

External links

Further reading